Helen of Hungary, also known as Helen the Fair (d. 1091), was a queen consort of Croatia.

Family 
Helen was born as a Hungarian princess and was the daughter of Árpád dynasty's king Bela I, sister to Ladislaus I of Hungary, granddaughter of Polish king Mieszko II Lambert.

Marriage 
Helen became queen of Croatia during her marriage with Croatian king Demetrius Zvonimir, a distant relative whom she married in 1063. They had a son named Radovan, who died in his late teens or early twenties, and daughters named Claudia and Vinica.

Helen had excellent family connections, being an aunt to Irene, the mother of the Byzantine Emperor Manuel I Komnenos.

Helen was very popular with the Croats, and they often called her Jelena Lijepa ("Helen the Beautiful"). She is thought to have been an influential consort.

Upon the death of Zvonimir, Helen was said to have been quietly plotting the inheritance of the Croatian Crown for her brother, the King of Hungary, which caused a decade of war and instability in the kingdom, resulting in the personal union of Croatia and Hungary that lasted until 1918. Helen died around 1091.

External links
Dmitar Zvonimir and Helen

|-

Notes 

Medieval Croatian nobility
11th-century Croatian people
Year of birth missing
1091 deaths
Hungarian princesses
11th-century Hungarian people
House of Árpád
Burials at the Church of St. Mary, Knin
11th-century Croatian women
11th-century Hungarian women
Croatian people of Hungarian descent 
Croatian people of Polish descent 
Croatian people of Bulgarian descent
Daughters of kings